The Kingdom of EnenKio is a claimed micronation near the Marshall Islands run by Robert Moore.

Background 
The Republic of the Marshall Islands has claimed Wake Island, which it calls "Ānen Kio" ("Enen-Kio" in older Marshallese orthography). In 1973, Marshallese lawmakers meeting in Saipan at the Congress of Micronesia, the legislative body for the Trust Territory of the Pacific Islands, asserted that "Enen-Kio is and always has been the property of the people of the Marshall Islands."  Their claim was based on oral legends and songs.  "EnenKio" means "Island of the orange flower" and comes from the Kio flower that is native to the island.

Claimed micronation 
The self-declared "Kingdom of EnenKio" has also claimed Wake Island as a separate sovereign nation and has issued passports.  The Kingdom of EnenKio is not recognized in any international forum as a sovereign state, nor does any internationally recognized state recognize it.  In 1997 the Dominion of Melchizedek, a micronation engaged in financial fraud, reported that the two had entered into relations.  The Kingdom of EnenKio is characterized as a scam by anti-fraud website Quatloos!  In 2000, Robert Moore, who claimed to be the head of state, was prevented by the U.S. Securities and Exchange Commission from fraudulently issuing bonds for the non-existent nation.

On 23 April 1998 the Marshall Islands government issued Circular Note 01-98, which vigorously denied the Kingdom of EnenKio and the Dominion of Melchizedek's claims, stating:

See also
List of micronations

References

External links
 

Secessionist organizations
EnenKio, Kingdom of
Wake Island
States and territories established in 1994